Norton CleanSweep, designed by Quarterdeck, was designed to aid in the removal of installed programs on Microsoft Windows.

CleanSweep was acquired by Symantec, and sold as a standalone product for a period of time. As of 2009, CleanSweep currently is unavailable from Symantec standalone and is incorporated in Norton SystemWorks.

How it works
Upon startup, CleanSweep loads three components, each of which tracks and logs changes made to aid in uninstallation. If the program has not been monitored CleanSweep can be pointed to the main executable file or the main program group. It also comprises several "wizards" to simplify common PC tuneup activities. The "Smart Sweep" module takes care of monitoring all the setup programs being run. On detecting the execution of a setup program it makes a note of the program files location, changes to Registry and other details. The "Internet Sweep" module monitors the installation of ActiveX controls and Plug-ins. The "Usage Watch" component keeps track of files which are being accessed. The "Unused and Low Usage File Finders" information collected through Usage Watch to determine which files are infrequently accessed and thus may no longer be needed.

File restoration
CleanSweep keeps backups of all uninstalled programs for a specified amount of time. If an essential file is accidentally removed, the user has the option of restoration.

Wizards
"Archive Wizard" can be used for compressing infrequently used program for later use.
"Backup Wizard" creates backups of programs without uninstallation.
"Move Wizard" allows moving programs between drives or to a new folder. The "Transport Wizard" helps in moving programs across computers.
"Registry Genie" simplifies registry tweaking and editing. It provides on the fly information on the entry being edited.
"Registry Sweep" scans the registry and removes invalid entries.
"Update-It" automatically updates CleanSweep.

References

CleanSweep
Gen Digital software
Utilities for Windows